The 2020 Big West Conference women's basketball tournament was the postseason women's basketball tournament that was scheduled to take place March 10–14, 2020, at two venues in the Los Angeles area. The first two rounds were scheduled for the Walter Pyramid in Long Beach, California, while the semifinals and championship were to be held at the Honda Center in Anaheim. The winner of the Big West tournament would have received the conference's automatic bid to the 2020 NCAA Division I women's basketball tournament. On March 10 it was announced the tournament will be played without spectators, in an effort to prevent the spread of the coronavirus. On March 12, the NCAA announced that the tournament was cancelled due to the coronavirus pandemic.

Seeds

Schedule

Bracket

References

Big West Conference women's basketball tournament
2019–20 Big West Conference women's basketball season
Basketball competitions in Los Angeles
College sports in Los Angeles
Big West Conference women's basketball tournament
College basketball tournaments in California